The Ninety Day Mistress is a 1967 sex comedy play. The original production starred Walter Abel and Dyan Cannon.

The play was profiled in the William Goldman book The Season: A Candid Look at Broadway.

References

External links
 

1967 plays